Stephenson House may refer to:

in Australia
 Gordon Stephenson House, an office building in Perth, Australia

in Canada
 Stephenson House (University of Toronto)

in the United States
Stephenson House (Oakman, Alabama), listed on the NRHP in Walker County, Alabama
Aday-Stephenson House, Marshall, Arkansas, listed on the NRHP in Searcy County, Arkansas 
Stephenson House (Round Hill, Kentucky), listed on the NRHP in Madison County, Kentucky 
Benjamin Stephenson House, Edwardsville, Illinois, NRHP-listed 
Stephenson-Allen House, Enterprise, Mississippi, listed on the NRHP in Clarke County, Mississippi
Stephenson-Campbell House, Cecil, Pennsylvania, NRHP-listed
 Oakland (Parkersburg, West Virginia), also known as the Stephenson House, NRHP-listed

See also
 Stevenson House (disambiguation)